Stepping Stone Model School is a private English-medium school located in Alipurduar, West Bengal, India. The school is affiliated to the Council for the Indian School Certificate Examinations. It was established on January 13, 1988.

About School
Students at this school have often participated in question-and-answer activities with Derek O'Brien.  These activities have been reported in The Telegraph newspaper.

This school have won many state - district championship in science. Passed - outs are known to be established in their fields.

The subjects offered are English, Hindi/Bengali, Physics, Chemistry, Biology, Mathematics, Computer Applications, Geography and History for ICSE (10th).

For ISC (12th), students can choose among the different streams i.e., Science, Arts and Commerce. The Science stream consists of Chemistry, Physics, Maths and Biology/Computer Science. The Commerce stream consists of Economics, Commerce, Accountancy and Maths/Computer Science. The Arts stream consists of History, Geography and Maths/Computer Science. English and Hindi/Bengali are compulsory for students.

Information
 Facilities Provided : Computer Lab, Chemistry lab, Play Ground, Sports, physics lab etc.
 Extracurricular activities : Education about Human Values, Yoga, Karate, Table Tennis and Volleyball.

Extracurricular activities

Inter House Sports 
Students are divided into three houses — Power, Peace and Prosperity. The Inter House Sports is held between those three houses alternately with the Annual Functions every year.

Year wise results

Notable alumni
Souvik Bose, scientist
Dipayan Roy, singer
Dipendu Das, author

See also
 West Bengal Board of Secondary Education (WBBSE), India
 West Bengal Council of Higher Secondary Education (WBCHSE), India
Education in India
List of schools in India
Education in West Bengal

References

External links
Homepage of Council for the Indian School Certificate Examinations (CISCE)

High schools and secondary schools in West Bengal
Alipurduar district
1988 establishments in West Bengal
Educational institutions established in 1988